The 1914 Geneva Covenanters football team was an American football team that represented Geneva College as an independent during the 1914 college football season. Led by second-year head coach C. Brainerd Metheny, the team compiled a record of 5–3.

Schedule

References

Geneva
Geneva Golden Tornadoes football seasons
Geneva Covenanters football